Mirko Holbus (Serbian Cyrillic: Мирко Холбус; 26 January 1940 – 15 January 2015) was a Serbian ice hockey player. He competed in the men's tournament at the 1964 Winter Olympics.

References

External links
 

1940 births
2015 deaths
Ice hockey players at the 1964 Winter Olympics
Olympic ice hockey players of Yugoslavia
People from Zemun
Yugoslav ice hockey forwards
Sportspeople from Belgrade
Serbian ice hockey forwards